Eight ships of the Royal Navy have been named HMS Royal Oak, after the Royal Oak in which Charles II hid himself during his flight from the country in the English Civil War:

  was a 76-gun second rate launched in 1664 and burnt by the Dutch in 1667 in the Raid on the Medway.
  was a 70-gun third rate launched in 1674, rebuilt in 1690, 1713, and 1741. Her 1741 rebuild left her as a 64-gun fourth rate.  She was a prison ship between 1756 and 1763, and was broken up in 1764.
  was a 74-gun third rate launched in 1769 and used as a prison ship from 1796. She was renamed  in 1805, and was broken up in 1815.
 HMS Royal Oak was to have been a 74-gun third rate but she was renamed  before her launch in 1798.
  was a 74-gun third rate launched in 1809, on harbour service from 1825, and broken up in 1850.
  was an ironclad frigate launched in 1862 and sold in 1885.
  was a  launched in 1892 and scrapped in 1914.
  was a  launched in 1914 and sunk at anchor in 1939, in Scapa Flow.

Battle honours
Ships named Royal Oak have earned the following battle honours:
Lowestoft, 1665
Four Days' Battle, 1666
Orfordness, 1666
Barfleur, 1692
Malaga, 1704
Passero, 1718
Chesapeake, 1781
The Saints, 1782
Jutland, 1916

Royal Navy ship names